Spaelotis havilae, known generally as the w-marked cutworm or western w-marked cutworm, is a species of cutworm or dart moth in the family Noctuidae. It is found in North America.

The MONA or Hodges number for Spaelotis havilae is 10927.

References

Further reading

 
 
 

Noctuinae
Articles created by Qbugbot
Moths described in 1881